Lawrence Arden Yule (born 1963) is a New Zealand politician. He was Mayor of Hastings from 2001 to 2017, and a Member of Parliament representing the Tukituki electorate for the National Party from 2017 to 2020.

Political career

Mayor of Hastings
Yule became mayor of Hastings in 2001. In this role he presided over the Hastings District Council. When elected he was the youngest person to become mayor of Hastings.

In 2016, the Hastings district was hit by an outbreak of campylobacter in drinking water which affected thousands of people.

In the last mayoral election he stood in, in 2016, Yule received more than 3,000 more votes than his closest rival. Yule announced that his sixth term, starting in 2016, would be his last as mayor.

National politics 

In February 2017, Yule was selected as the National Party's candidate for the electorate of Tukituki in the 2017 general election. The seat had been held by National MP Craig Foss since 2005, but Foss announced his retirement from politics in December 2016. Yule defeated the Labour Party's Anna Lorck, who Yule had previously hired as a public relations consultant for local election campaigns. Yule resigned as Hastings Mayor, resulting in a by-election held in November 2017.

In the 2020 New Zealand general election, Yule stood again for Tukituki, again going up against Anna Lorck. Yule lost the electorate to Lorck by 1,590 votes, in an election that saw National lose 18 of its 41 electorate seats. The day after the election, Yule admitted defeat and said he had no plans for his future yet.

Other roles 
Yule was the president of Local Government New Zealand. He is also a justice of the peace.

Personal life
Yule is married to his wife Kerryn. He has four adult children.

References

|-

Living people
1963 births
Mayors of Hastings, New Zealand
People from Hastings, New Zealand
New Zealand National Party MPs
Candidates in the 2017 New Zealand general election
New Zealand MPs for North Island electorates
New Zealand justices of the peace
Unsuccessful candidates in the 2020 New Zealand general election